The 2010 Saudi Crown Prince Cup Final was the 35th final of the Crown Prince Cup. It took place on 19 February 2010 at the King Fahd International Stadium in Riyadh, Saudi Arabia and was contested between Al-Ahli and Al-Hilal. It was Al-Ahli's 11th Crown Prince Cup final and Al-Hilal's 10th final. This was the third meeting between these two clubs in the final. It was Al-Ahli's first final since 2007 and Al-Hilal's third final in a row.

Al-Hilal won the match 2–1 to claim their ninth Crown Prince Cup title and third one in a row.

Teams

Venue

The King Fahd International Stadium was announced as the host of the final venue. This was the tenth Crown Prince Cup final hosted in the King Fahd International Stadium following those in 1992, 1994, 1998, 2003, 2004, 2005, 2006, 2008 and 2009.

The King Fahd International Stadium was built in 1982 and was opened in 1987. The stadium was used as a venue for the 1992, 1995, and the 1997 editions of the FIFA Confederations Cup. Its current capacity is 68,752 and it is used by the Saudi Arabia national football team, Al-Nassr, Al-Shabab, and major domestic matches.

Background
Al-Ahli reached their eleventh final, after a defeating Al-Shabab 3–1 on penalties. They reached their first final since 2007 when they won the tournament after defeating Al-Ittihad 2–1.

Al-Hilal reached their tenth final after a 2–1 win against Najran. This was Al-Hilal's third final in a row.

This was the third meeting between these two sides in the Crown Prince Cup final. Al-Hilal won twice in 2003 and 2006. The two teams played each other three times in the season prior to the final with Al-Hilal winning all 3 matches. Twice in the League, 2–1 and 3–1, and once in the Federation Cup semi-final, 4–3.

Road to the final 

Key: (H) = Home; (A) = Away

Match

Details

See also

 2009–10 Saudi Crown Prince Cup
 2009–10 Saudi Professional League
 2010 King Cup of Champions

References

External links

Sports competitions in Saudi Arabia
February 2010 sports events in Asia
Al-Ahli Saudi FC matches
Al Hilal SFC matches